iUniverse, founded in October 1999, is an American self-publishing company based in Bloomington, Indiana.

History
Soon after they were founded, Barnes & Noble purchased a 49% stake in the company. As part of the agreement, Barnes & Noble offered select iUniverse titles both in their online bookstore and at their physical stores.

In 2004, Amy Fisher's memoir, If I Knew Then, about serving seven years in prison on first-degree aggravated assault charges for shooting Mary Jo Buttafuoco, became the best-selling book in iUniverse's history, selling more than 32,000 copies up to 2004. According to a 2005 Publishers Weekly article, out of the more than 18,000 titles published by iUniverse until 2004, only 83 had sold at least 500 copies and only 14 titles had been sold through physical Barnes & Noble stores.

In September 2007, iUniverse was purchased by Author Solutions, the parent company of hedge fund-owned rival AuthorHouse. In 2008, iUniverse operations moved from Lincoln, Nebraska to Bloomington, Indiana where Author Solution's headquarters are located.

See also

 Alternative media
 List of self-publishing companies
 Print on demand
 Small press

References

External links
iUniverse Official site

Book publishing companies based in Indiana
Publishing companies established in 1999
Companies based in Bloomington, Indiana
Self-publishing companies
1999 establishments in Indiana